The 2021 season was the Jacksonville Jaguars' 27th season in the National Football League (NFL).  This was their only season under head coach Urban Meyer and first under general manager Trent Baalke. 

Jacksonville had the first overall pick in the 2021 NFL Draft, which they used to select Trevor Lawrence. The Jaguars came into the season with a 15-game losing streak from the last season. The losing streak continued this season as the Jaguars started 0–5, before defeating the Miami Dolphins 23–20 in London. To date, the 2020–21 Jaguars' 20-game losing streak is the third longest losing streak in NFL history, after the 1976–77 Tampa Bay Buccaneers (26) and 1942–45 Chicago Cardinals (29). 

The Jaguars finished 3–14, improving upon their 1–15 record from the previous season.  However, they were eliminated from playoff contention for the fourth straight year, following a Week 14 loss to the Tennessee Titans. The Jaguars clinched the first overall pick in the 2022 NFL Draft, becoming the first team since the Cleveland Browns in the 2017 and 2018 Drafts to have the top pick in back-to-back years.

On December 16, after less than a year and following repeated scandals involving the team, Meyer was fired as head coach and replaced with Darrell Bevell for the remainder of the season.

Season summary
The team was criticized by the media following repeated scandals involving the team, with head coach Urban Meyer the most caught up in multiple scandals. During the offseason, some of Meyer's staff hires and free agent signings received backlash. In February, former Iowa strength coach Chris Doyle, who had left that job due to allegations of racism and bullying players, was hired as the Jaguars' strength coach before fan backlash led to him resigning one day later. In addition, the signing of former Florida and NFL quarterback Tim Tebow as a tight end was criticized as a publicity grab, especially as Tebow had not played a down of football since the 2015 preseason and was eventually cut after the first preseason game. On July 1, 2021, the Jaguars were fined $200,000 and Meyer was fined $100,000 for OTA violations. The NFLPA then investigated the Jaguars after Meyer claimed that vaccination status was taken into account when deciding the roster cuts.

In October, a video surfaced appearing to show Meyer inappropriately touching a woman who was not his wife while he was at his Columbus-area restaurant, Urban Meyer's Pint House, following a loss to the Cincinnati Bengals. Jaguars owner Shahid Khan said that Meyer's behavior had been "inexcusable" and that Meyer "must regain our trust and respect". Meyer later apologized to the team and personnel.

Meyer was also criticized for benching running back James Robinson during losses to the Seattle Seahawks and Los Angeles Rams. During the loss to the Rams, Meyer claimed that Robinson's benching was "injury-related" and quarterback Trevor Lawrence had to request to put James Robinson in.

The tension surrounding the team got worse in December 2021, when Jaguars players and coaches were critical of Meyer's treatment of them, to which the team officially responded with assertions of Meyer's job security. Meyer and wide receiver Marvin Jones got into a heated argument where Jones left the Jaguars facility. Jones returned to the facility when other staff members convinced Jones to come back, only to get into another argument with Meyer at practice. Jones would later deny getting into an argument with Meyer.

Meyer also reportedly called his assistant coaches "losers" and that he was a "winner" and challenged assistants to defend their resumes. Owner Shahid Khan met with players, members of the team's business department and coaches, including Meyer following the Jaguars loss to the Tennessee Titans in Week 14.

On December 15, 2021, former Jaguars kicker Josh Lambo alleged that Meyer kicked him in the leg during a practice in the week before the Jaguars' final preseason game against the Dallas Cowboys. According to Lambo, Meyer also shouted at him, "Hey dipshit, make your fucking kicks." (Lambo had missed a field goal in each of the previous two preseason games.) After Lambo told Meyer never to kick him again, Meyer responded, "I’m the head ball coach, I’ll kick you whenever the fuck I want." Later that day, Lambo reported the incident to his agent, who then reported it to the Jaguars team.

Urban Meyer was fired on December 16, 2021 finishing his tenure with the Jaguars with a 2–11 (.154) record. Darrell Bevell was named interim head coach for the remainder of the season. Prior to Meyer's dismissal, quarterback Trevor Lawrence criticized the drama affecting the team in a press conference, without naming Meyer.

During the final week of the season, numerous Jaguars fans attended the team's home game against the Indianapolis Colts dressed as clowns in protest of unpopular moves by team management and the Jaguars' overall struggles.

Draft

Pre-draft trades
The Los Angeles Rams traded their 2020 first-round selection (K'Lavon Chaisson) as well as their 2021 first (Travis Etienne) and fourth (Jordan Smith) round selections to Jacksonville in exchange for cornerback Jalen Ramsey.
Minnesota traded their second-round selection, along with a previously-conditional 2022 fifth-round selection, to Jacksonville in exchange for defensive end Yannick Ngakoue. The fifth-round selection would have upgraded to the fourth round if Ngakoue had gone to the Pro Bowl at the end of the 2020 season, but he was not named, or the third round if the Vikings had won the Super Bowl, but they were eliminated from postseason contention.
Cleveland traded a fifth-round selection to Jacksonville in exchange for safety Ronnie Harrison.
Jacksonville traded a sixth-round selection to Tennessee in exchange for a seventh-round selection and linebacker Kamalei Correa.
Jacksonville traded a seventh-round selection to New Orleans in exchange for defensive tackle Malcom Brown.

Draft day trades
The Los Angeles Rams traded their fourth-round selection (#121 overall) and sixth-round selection (#209 overall) for the Jaguars' fourth, fifth, and seventh-round selections (#130, #170, and #249 overall).

Staff

Final roster

Preseason
The Jaguars' preseason opponents were announced on May 12.

Regular season
Jacksonville’s schedule was announced on May 12. Ahead of the schedule release it was confirmed that the Jaguars would face the Houston Texans away to open the season and would host the Miami Dolphins at Tottenham Hotspur Stadium in week 6 on October 17. This was the Jaguars' eighth home game in London but their first at Tottenham Hotspur Stadium.

Schedule

Note: Intra-division opponents are in bold text.

Game summaries

Week 1: at Houston Texans

Week 2: vs. Denver Broncos

Week 3: vs. Arizona Cardinals

Week 4: at Cincinnati Bengals

Week 5: vs. Tennessee Titans

Week 6: vs. Miami Dolphins
NFL London games

Week 8: at Seattle Seahawks

Week 9: vs. Buffalo Bills

Week 10: at Indianapolis Colts

Week 11: vs. San Francisco 49ers

Week 12: vs. Atlanta Falcons

Week 13: at Los Angeles Rams

Week 14: at Tennessee Titans

Week 15: vs. Houston Texans

Week 16: at New York Jets

Week 17: at New England Patriots

Week 18: vs. Indianapolis Colts

Standings

Division

Conference

See also
2007 Atlanta Falcons season, whose coach, Bobby Petrino, also lasted less than one season.
2022 Denver Broncos season, whose coach, Nathaniel Hackett, also lasted less than one season.
List of other NFL teams affected by internal conflict

References

External links
 

Jacksonville
Jacksonville Jaguars seasons
Jacksonville Jaguars